The Food Wars!: Shokugeki no Soma manga is written by Yūto Tsukuda and published by Shueisha in Weekly Shōnen Jump and Jump Giga! for its 3-part epilogue. It began as a one-shot in April 2012 and then began as a series in November 2012 and then ended in June 2019.

Volume list

See also
List of Food Wars: Shokugeki no Soma episodes
List of Food Wars: Shokugeki no Soma characters

Notes

References

External links
Official website

Food Wars Shokugeki no Soma